The 2017 Atlantic 10 women's basketball tournament was a postseason tournament that played at campus sites on February 25 and 26 for the first round and the quarterfinals; the semifinals and championship game were held on March 3–5 at the Richmond Coliseum in Richmond, Virginia. Dayton won their second A-10 tournament title and earn an automatic bid to the NCAA women's tournament.

Seeds
Teams are seeded by record within the conference, with a tiebreaker system to seed teams with identical conference records.

Schedule

*Game times in Eastern Time. #Rankings denote tournament seeding.

Bracket

References

See also
2017 Atlantic 10 men's basketball tournament

2016–17 Atlantic 10 Conference women's basketball season
Atlantic 10 women's basketball tournament